The Minerva Armoured Car was a military armoured car expediently developed from Minerva civilian automobiles by Belgium at the start of the First World War.

Background 

At the beginning of the twentieth century, the first military armoured vehicles were manufactured by adding armour and weapons to existing vehicles. The first armoured car was the Simms' Motor War Car, designed by F.R. Simms in response to the Second Boer War and built by Vickers, Sons & Maxim in Britain

Another early armoured car of the period was the French Charron, Girardot et Voigt 1902, presented at the Salon de l'Automobile et du cycle in Brussels, on 8 March 1902. The vehicle was equipped with a Hotchkiss machine gun, and with 7 mm armour for the gunner although it, too, was only a prototype and never used in warfare.

History 
The Minerva's use in combat in August 1914 made Belgium the first Nation to employ armoured cars in World War I, though Italy had previously been the first to use armoured cars in a theatre of conflict, in the 1911–1912 Italo-Turkish War. Also the armoured Canadian Automobile Machine Gun Brigade was formed on August 24, 1914 and close to being assembled by that September.

During the war those that could afford to rode into battle on their own horses, much like this (in 1914) Lieutenant Charles Henkart arranged for two of his civilian Minerva Motor Works tourers to be armoured at the Cockerill Works in Hoboken. The initial armoured cars were ad hoc but soon Minerva had created a standard design. American papers were reporting the use of the armoured car by September 1914. The crew was partially exposed to gunfire with the open top. This would prove fatal to Lieutenant Henkart when on September 6, 1914 he was killed by gunfire after the armoured car he was in was caught in a German ambush. Before the Minerva factory was captured during the German invasion and occupation of Belgium about thirty Minerva armored cars were built. In 1916 the design of the original armoured car was completely revised. The open top was now fully enclosed and the machine gun under an armoured cupola. The Belgian Army used the cars as motorised cavalry units with three-car platoons. The armoured car units were mostly used for reconnaissance, infantry fire support and missions behind enemy lines. After the Western Front became bogged down in trench warfare some of the cars were sent to the Eastern Front with the Belgian Expeditionary Corps in Russia.

The Germans were able to capture three of the cars and modified them for use during the invasion of Romania with at least one being used during the 1919 troubles.

Bibliography 
Notes

References

 - Total pages: 32 

 - Total pages: 176 
 - Total pages: 304 
 - Total pages: 248 
 - Total pages: 256 

 - Total pages: 2454 
 - Total pages: 379 
 - Total pages: 783  
 - Total pages: 816

External links 

Minerva at Tanks-Encyclopedia.com
Minerva Armoured Motor Car

World War I armoured cars
Armoured fighting vehicles of Belgium
Vehicles introduced in 1914
Military history of Belgium during World War I